Events in the year 2006 in Eritrea.

Incumbents 

 President: Isaias Afewerki

Events 

 March 14 – United Nations Security Council Resolution 1661 was adopted unanimously and extended the mandate of the United Nations Mission in Ethiopia and Eritrea (UNMEE) for a period of one month until April 15, 2006.

Deaths

References 

 
2000s in Eritrea
Years of the 21st century in Eritrea
Eritrea
Eritrea